Blanquism refers to a conception of revolution generally attributed to Louis Auguste Blanqui (1805–1881) that holds that socialist revolution should be carried out by a relatively small group of highly organised and secretive conspirators. Having seized power, the revolutionaries would then use the power of the state to introduce socialism.

Blanquism is distinguished from other socialist currents in various ways: on the one hand, Blanqui did not believe in the predominant role of the proletariat, nor did he believe in popular movements—instead he believed that revolution should be carried out by a small group of professional, dedicated revolutionaries, who would establish a temporary dictatorship by force. This dictatorship would permit the implementation of the basis of a new order, after which power would then be handed to the people. In another respect, Blanqui was more concerned with the revolution itself rather than the future society that would result from it—if his thought was based on precise socialist principles. Blanquist thought rarely goes so far as to imagine a purely socialist society. For Blanquists, the overturning of the bourgeois social order and the revolution are ends sufficient in themselves, at least for their immediate purposes.

Central Revolutionary Committee 

The Central Revolutionary Committee (CRC) was a French Blanquist political party founded in 1881 and dissolved in 1898.

The CRC was founded by Édouard Vaillant to continue the political struggle of Auguste Blanqui (1805–1881). The CRC was a Blanquist party, supporting revolutionary activism, atheism, patriotism, and the Jacobinism of the French Revolution. The CRC was weakened by a split in 1888, when numerous members (Henri Rochefort) followed General Georges Boulanger who synthesized Jacobin nationalism with socialism. Many saw Boulangism as a possible way to socialism. Following the Boulangist dissidence, Vaillant adopted a strategy of syndicalism and strike action.

The CRC was further re-enforced by the affiliation of the Revolutionary Communist Alliance (ACR), formed by dissidents of the Revolutionary Socialist Workers' Party (POSR) in 1896.

The CRC merged into the Socialist Revolutionary Party in 1898.

Use of the term "Blanquism" 
The term "Blanquism" has often been used polemically to accuse some revolutionaries of failing to sufficiently meld their praxis with the mass working class. Karl Marx and Friedrich Engels were keen to distinguish their conception of revolution from Blanquism. As Engels put it in a short fragment, The Program of the Blanquist Fugitives from the Paris Commune:

Vladimir Lenin 
Rosa Luxemburg and Eduard Bernstein have criticised Vladimir Lenin that his conception of revolution was elitist and essentially Blanquist. For instance, as part of a longer section on Blanquism in her Organizational Questions of the Russian Social Democracy (later published as Leninism or Marxism?), Luxemburg writes: 

By "social democracy", Luxemburg has in mind the original use of the term derived from Marx and synonymous with "socialism"; she conceived of the social democratic party as a mass based organisation of working class struggle. However, Lenin dismissed as meaningless rhetoric the conflation of Blanquism with Bolshevism: 

Lenin himself denied any accusations of Blanquism in The State and Revolution (1917) and accused Bernstein of "opportunism".

Bibliography 
 Bernstein, Samuel. Auguste Blanqui. 1970.
 Hutton, Patrick. The Cult of the Revolutionary Tradition: The Blanquists in French Politics, 1864-1893. 1981.
 Spitzer, Alan. The Revolutionary Theories of Louis-Auguste Blanqui. 1951.

References 

Communism
Eponymous political ideologies
Political science terminology
Revolution terminology
Socialism in France